Marie Versini (10 August 1940 – 22 November 2021) was a French film and television actress.

Career
Versini appeared in several international cinema productions. After playing in Karl May film adaptations she received a number of German popularity awards.

She died on 22 November 2021 in Guingamp, Brittany.

Selected filmography

Awards

References

External links 
 
 
 
  Interview (2009) 

1940 births
2021 deaths
Actresses from Paris
French film actresses
French television actresses
20th-century French actresses
21st-century French actresses